Faust L. "Frosty" Ferzacca (January 29, 1908 – August 13, 2004) was an American football coach and college athletics administrator.  He served as the head football coach at Marquette University from 1954 to 1955 and at Northern Michigan University from 1957 to 1965, compiling a career college football record of 58–36–4.  He then worked as the athletic director at Eastern Michigan University from 1966 to 1973 and at Florida International University from 1974 to 1975 before serving as the commissioner of the Mid-Continent Conference—now known as the Summit League—from 1982 to 1988.

Early life and playing career
Ferazza was a native of Iron Mountain, Michigan and attended Iron Mountain High School.  He moved on to Lake Forest College in 1927, where he lettered in football, basketball, and baseball.  Ferazza played minor league baseball for the Superior Blues of the Northern League in 1933.

Coaching career
Ferzacca starting his coaching career at Iron Mountain High School.  He also coached in Montreal, Wisconsin before moving to Green Bay West High School in 1937 as an assistant football coach and head basketball coach.  In 1945, Ferzacca became head football coach at Green Bay West when illness forced his predecessor, Lars Thune, to retire.  At this point, Ferzacca gave up his responsibilities as basketball coach but also served at the school's athletic director and  track coach.  Ferzacca  remained as the head football coach at Green Bay West for nine seasons, through 1953, leading his team to five Fox River Valley championships and an overall record of 62–16–3.

In January 1954, Ferzacca was named the head football coach at Marquette University, succeeding Lisle Blackbourn, who had taken the head coaching job with the Green Bay Packers of the National Football League.  Ferzacca signed a three-year contract with Marquette that paid him an annual salary of $10,000.  In 1950, Ferzacca had been offered a position as backfield coach at Marquette under Blackbourn, but remained at Green Bay West when he signed a new contract with the high school that reportedly gave him "substantial benefits".

Death
Ferzacca died on August 13, 2004, at a nursing home in Green Bay, Wisconsin.

Head coaching record

College football

References

External links
 

1908 births
2004 deaths
American football quarterbacks
American men's basketball players
Eastern Michigan Eagles athletic directors
FIU Panthers athletic directors
Green Bay Bluejays players
Green Bay Packers executives
Marquette Golden Avalanche football coaches
Lake Forest Foresters baseball players
Lake Forest Foresters football players
Lake Forest Foresters men's basketball players
Northern Michigan Wildcats football coaches
Summit League commissioners
Superior Blues players
College men's track and field athletes in the United States
High school basketball coaches in Wisconsin
High school football coaches in Wisconsin
People from Iron Mountain, Michigan
Players of American football from Michigan